Rosztóczy is a surname of Hungarian origins. Notable people with the surname include:

Ernő Rosztóczy (1899–1969), Hungarian physician
István Rosztóczy (1942–1993), Hungarian medical researcher, microbiologist, the former's son
András Rosztóczy (born 1967), Hungarian medical researcher, gastroenterologist, the former's son

Hungarian-language surnames